Non-Government Teachers' Registration and Certification Authority is a Bangladesh government regulatory agency under the Ministry of Education responsible for the registration and certification of teachers in private educational institutes under the government monthly pay order (MPO).

History
Non-Government Teachers' Registration and Certification Authority was established in 2005 by the Government of Bangladesh. It holds annual Teachers Registration Examinations in Bangladesh. In 2017, 527,757 candidates took the examination and 147,262 of them passed. The authority has published 17th NTRCA syllabus.

References

2005 establishments in Bangladesh
Organisations based in Dhaka
Government agencies of Bangladesh
Regulators of Bangladesh